The University of Veterinary and Animal Sciences, originally known as Lahore Veterinary College, is a public university located in Lahore, Punjab, Pakistan. It is accredited by the Pakistan Veterinary Medical Council (PVMC). It has additional teaching campuses in rural areas of the Punjab, Pattoki and Jhang.

Established in 1882, it is one of the oldest institution of veterinary sciences and microbiology in Asia and one of the earliest institution founded by the Great Britain in indian subcontinent.  Since its inception, it maintained its reoccupation as one of the famous and renown institution Veterinary and animal sciences and conducts wide range of research in microbiology and development of human resources. It was also affiliated with University Of Agriculture, Faisalabad for some years and then become a distinct entity. The university offers undergraduate, post-graduate and doctoral programs in diverse fields of animals health, food irradiation, security and safety. The university maintains its highest ranks and regarded as one of the top university in "agriculture" category by the Higher Education Commission (Pakistan) (HEC), as of 2010.

In June 2002, on the up gradation of the college of veterinary sciences to the status of the University, Punjab Government allotted about 1000 Acres at Pattoki for the establishment of the sub campus for the education and research work activities. This is named as University of Veterinary and Animal Sciences (Ravi Campus). 
Aim/Vision/Objectives
To impart quality education with rich opportunities of Hands on Training & research.      
Development of about 1000 acres of land taken over from Government of Punjab.
Preparation of land for cultivation of fodder for experimental animals
Production of fodder for University farms (Dairy & Small Ruminants)
Sowing of fodder cash crops etc. for income generation

Commercialization of research and expertise from the university also plays and generates significant economic growth and business opportunities in Pakistan, as many recommendation by university's think tanks are adopted by the government. The university's own program is focused towards building efforts on poverty reduction, prosperity, livestock production and building a generation of trained manpower in the country.

Academic Divisions
 Faculty of Veterinary Sciences
 Faculty of Bio sciences 
 Faculty of Animal Production & Technology
 Faculty of Fisheries and Wildlife
 Faculty of Life Sciences Business Management
 Institute of Biochemistry & Biotechnology
 Institute of Continuing Education & Extension
 Institute of Microbiology
 Institute of Pharmaceutical Sciences
 Internationally Accredited University Diagnostic Lab (over ISO 17025)
 Internationally Accredited Quality Operations Lab (over ISO 17025)
 Central Laboratory Complex (C.L.C.)
 Bioequivalence Study Center
 Pet Center
 Information Technology center
 Business Incubation Center

Undergraduate degree programs

(Undergraduate Degrees at City Campus)
 Doctor of Veterinary Medicine (DVM) (5 Year)(City/Ravi Campus)
 Doctor of Pharmacy (Pharm-D) (5 Year)
 BS (Hons.) Applied Microbiology
 BS (Hons.) Nutrition & Dietetics
 BS (Hons.) Biotechnology
 BS (Hons.) Biochemistry
 BS (Hons.) Environmental Sciences
 BS (Hons.) Medical lab technology  
 BS (Hons.) Biological Sciences
 BS (Hons.) Food Science and Technology
 BBA (Hons)

Undergraduate Degrees at Ravi Campus
 BS (Hons.) Biological Sciences
 BS (Hons.) Botany               
 BS (Hons.) Dairy Technology  
 BS (Hons.) Fisheries and Aquaculture 
 BS (Hons.) Medical Lab Technology
 BS (Hons.) Poultry Science           
 BS (Hons.) Zoology

Master level degree programs

 MBA (Executive)(Evening) (2 Year)
 MBA Life Sciences (3.5 Year)
 MBA Banking & Finance (3.5 Year) 
 M.Sc Zoology (2 Year)
 M.Sc Biochemistry (2 Year)
 M.Sc Biological Sciences (2 Year)

The following Postgraduate degree programs (M.Phil & Ph.D) are  offered in different disciplines. The number of students has increased from 650 in 2003 to 4000 in 2011.

M.Phil.

 Botany
 Microbiology
 Pathology 
 Parasitology 
 Theriogenology
 Clinical Medicine and Surgery (Medicine)
 Clinical Medicine and Surgery (Surgery) 
 Epidemiology and Public Health 
 Food and Nutrition (Animal Nutrition)
 Food and Nutrition (Human Nutrition)
 Poultry Production 
 Livestock Production (Animal Breeding and Genetics) 
 Livestock Production (Livestock Management)
 Dairy Technology
 Pharmacology
 Physiology
 Anatomy and Histology
 Wildlife and Ecology
 Fisheries and Aquaculture
 Molecular Biology and Biotechnology 
 Biochemistry
 Forensic Sciences
 Bioinformatics
 Pharmaceutical Sciences
 Zoology
 One Health

Ph.D.

 Microbiology
 Pathology
 Parasitology 
 Theriogenology
 Clinical Medicine and Surgery (Medicine)
 Epidemiology and Public Health 
 Food and Nutrition (Animal Nutrition)
 Food and Nutrition (Human Nutrition)
 Poultry Production 
 Livestock Production (Animal Breeding and Genetics) 
 Livestock Production (Livestock Management)
 Dairy Technology
 Pharmacology
 Physiology
 Anatomy and Histology
 Wildlife and Ecology
 Fisheries and Aquaculture
 Molecular Biology and Biotechnology 
 Biochemistry
 Bioinformatics
 Zoology

Institute of Continuing Education and Extension

The Institute of Continuing Education and Extension that was established in July 2002 with the main objective to uplift the rural farming community and contribute to national economic development. To achieve the goal, the institute has been offering diploma/certificate courses and vocational educational programs in livestock, poultry, dairy, fisheries, wildlife, etc. The subject specialists of this institute are also providing extension services to farmers at their doorsteps. This institute has trained thousands of farmers, para-vets and veterinarians in different disciplines of livestock production and management.

Diploma courses

 Livestock Assistant Diploma   
 Poultry Assistant Diploma   
 Dairy Herd Supervisor Diploma   
 Training of Community Livestock Extension Workers

Sub-campus
 College of Veterinary and Animal Sciences, Jhang
 University of Veterinary and Animal Sciences (Ravi Campus)
 Cholistan University of Veterinary and Animal Sciences, Bahawalpur
 Khan Bahadar Choudhry Mushtaq Ahmed College of Veterinary and Animal Sciences, Narowal
 Para-Veterinary Institute, Karor Lal-Eason Layyah

See also
 Pakistan Veterinary Medical Council
 Fisheries Research and Training Institute, Lahore
 Cholistan University of Veterinary and Animal Sciences, Bahawalpur
 College of Veterinary and Animal Sciences, Jhang

References

External links
 UVAS official website

 
Public universities and colleges in Punjab, Pakistan
Universities and colleges in Lahore
Veterinary schools in Pakistan
Educational institutions established in 1882
Animal research institutes
1882 establishments in India
Lahore
Lahore District